S. tinctoria may refer to:
 Serratula tinctoria, the saw-wort, a plant species native of Europe
 Symplocos tinctoria, the sweetleaf, horse-sugar or yellowwood, a deciduous or evergreen shrub or tree species found in the United States

See also
 Tinctoria